Philip Fitzgerald (known as Fitzy) is a Scottish rugby union player, born  in Stirling (Scotland), who played as a hooker for RC Toulonnais (1.84 m, 100 kg).

Career 
 1995–1997 : Watsonians (Edinburgh) 
 Summer 1997 : Manly (Sydney) 
 1997–1998 : RC Toulon 
 1998–1999 : Boroughmuir (Edinburgh) 
 1999-2010 : RC Toulon

Honours

Club 
 Pro D2 Champions : 2005, 2008
 Finalist : 2001
 Champion de France Reichel : 1998
 Winner of the challenge des Provinces Reichel : 1998

National team 
 Scotland A – 2008
 Scotland Universities- Universities World Cup in 2000
 Scotland U19- 1996
 FIRA Scotland Juniors in 1996
 Scotland Schoolboys from 1993 to 1995

Personal 
 Member of the Scottish team of the year for 2007 at hooker

External links 
  Player profile at lequipe.fr
  Statistics at itsrugby.fr

References 

1977 births
Living people
Boroughmuir RFC players
RC Toulonnais players
Rugby union hookers
Rugby union players from Stirling
Scotland 'A' international rugby union players
Scottish rugby union players
Watsonians RFC players